Rufio was an American rock band from Rancho Cucamonga, California, United States, in 2000. They released four studio albums: Perhaps, I Suppose (2001); MCMLXXXV (2003); The Comfort of Home (2005); and Anybody Out There (2010).

History
Rufio was formed when bassist Jon Berry was a freshman in college and the other three members, Scott Sellers, Mike Jimenez, and Clark Domae were in high school. Sellers and Domae had been acquainted for some time and found a shared talent in the guitar. Sellers met Berry and they began playing together in various groups and sessions. Around the same time, the two purchased a 4-track to record the songs they were writing. After Berry and Sellers began recording, they asked Jimenez to listen to their recordings and play drums with them. Domae joined shortly after and completed the official lineup. The band took their name from the character Rufio, leader of the Lost Boys in the absence of Peter Pan in the 1991 film Hook.

Rufio released its debut record, Perhaps, I Suppose..., in 2001 on The Militia Group label. In November 2001, the band signed to Nitro Records. In November and December 2002, the band supported the Ataris on their headlining US tour. Rufio released their self-titled EP through Nitro on February 25, 2003. MCMLXXXV was released on June 17, 2003, which was recorded with producer Nick Raskulinecz. Rufio went on to play on the Warped Tour that summer. In November, the band went on a US tour with Less Than Jake. In April and May 2004, the band went on the headlining US tour, with support from Senses Fail, Autopilot Off, and Don't Look Down. The band's third album, The Comfort of Home, was released in July 2005. The band embarked on a tour that fall, with MxPx and Relient K.

In late January 2006, Berry and Jimenez left Rufio, citing creative differences. Following the loss of two members, the band pulled out of their tour with No Use for a Name. While no official statement had then been made regarding a breakup, in a 2006 interview, No Use for a Name acknowledged as much.

Since leaving Rufio, Jimenez formed a new band called Science Fiction Theater. Sellers and Domae started a band called BigCity.

On April 5, 2007, the band announced on their MySpace page that they were to play an official farewell show on June 1, 2007, at The Glass House in Pomona, California, followed by a South American tour. The statement in full read:

"Farewell show and South American tour.

well... it's been a while friends... and we've finally decided that its time to do an official farewell show with all the members of Rufio on June 1. We thought it would be a good way to show our appreciation to all our hometown friends and fans who have supported us from the very beginning. We figured the Glasshouse would be a very appropriate venue to host the show and we hope to see ALLLL of you there! we'll be playing a variety of songs, and even oldies we rarely play! It's going to be a sad night but it also means the birth of new projects and new music! We're also going down to South America in June for one last hoorah. we're very excited about this. there are some shows posted right now, and more will be posted later. we cant wait to party with you crazy South Americans! come party with us one last time! Love, Rufio."

However, the band played a few gigs in 2008, and on December 27, 2009, drummer Terry Stirling Jr. announced the release of an EP to be titled The Loneliest.

Rufio announced it was recording an album that was slated for release in the summer of 2010, followed by worldwide touring.

In October 2010, Domae announced that he was leaving the band to pursue other projects.

In a YouTube video released by Stirling Jr., he has reportedly left Rufio to pursue other endeavors as of April 2011. In July 2012, the band responded to a fan comment, stating that they were breaking up. Sellers has moved on from Rufio and was involved with the production and guest vocals for the band The Lost Boys Club, which continues on the part of Rufio being the leader of The Lost Boys.

The band announced that they would be playing a one-off reunion show on June 18, 2015, at the Montebello Amnesia Rockfest.

Former members
Musicians
 Scott Sellers – lead vocals, rhythm guitar (2000–2007, 2010–2012, 2015)
 Nathan Walker – drums (2007)
 Terry Stirling Jr. – drums (2010–2011)
 Clark Domae – lead guitar, backing vocals (2000–2006, 2010–2011, 2015)
 Mike Jimenez – drums (2000–2006, 2015)
 Jeremy Binion – lead guitar, backing vocals (2007)
 Taylor Albaugh – bass, backing vocals (2010–2012, 2015)
 Jon Berry – bass, backing vocals (2000–2007)

Timeline

Discography

Albums
Perhaps, I Suppose... (2001, The Militia Group)
MCMLXXXV (2003, Nitro Records) - #168 US Billboard 200
The Comfort of Home (2005, Nitro Records) - #199 US Billboard 200
Anybody Out There (2010, The Militia Group)

Singles and EPs
Rufio EP (2003, Nitro Records)
"Above Me" (Acoustic) 7" (2007, sold on their South American farewell tour dates)The Loneliest'' EP (2010)

References

External links
Rufio on MySpace
Rufio on Nitro Records!
Scott Sellers side project
Mercy Street (Side project)

Musical groups established in 2001
Punk rock groups from California
Musical groups disestablished in 2015
Pop punk groups from California